Samuel Alfred Varley (1832–1921) was an English electrical engineer. He was one of ten children born to Cornelius Varley and Elizabeth Livermore Straker.

Career
In 1852, Samuel started work for the Electric Telegraph Company in Manchester.  His brother, C. F. Varley, had been employed by the same company since 1849. During the 1850s, Samuel was involved in supervising field telegraphs in the Crimean War.  He also published papers on cable signalling. In 1861, Samuel took over the running of a telegraph factory in London, owned by his father.

Inventions
In 1866, he was among the first to make a self-excited dynamo. Other contenders were Charles Wheatstone and Werner von Siemens. He also invented compound winding for dynamos.

In 1873, he read a paper at the Society of Engineers. The subject was "Railway Train Intercommunication" and he described a system fitted to the London and North Western Railway Royal Train.

Family
In 1860, Samuel married Emily Andrews and the couple had seven children.

Death
Samuel died at Abbottsacre Lodge, Abbott's Road, Winchester on 4 August 1921.

References

1832 births
1921 deaths
English electrical engineers
English inventors